SS Kronprinzessin Cecilie may refer to one of these ships:

 SS Kronprinzessin Cecilie (1893), ex Prinz Waldemar (1893), twin screw, steel steamer built Howaldtswerke-Deutsche Werft, Kiel, still registered in early 1930s as owned by Mecklenburger Seebüder-Linie, Rostock, Germany

Ship names